NGC 570 is a barred spiral galaxy. It is located in the Cetus constellation about 250 million light-years from the Milky Way. It was discovered by the American astronomer George Mary Searle in 1867.

See also 
 List of NGC objects (1–1000)

References

External links 
 

570
Barred spiral galaxies
Cetus (constellation)
Discoveries by George Searle
005539